Aadanthe Ado Type is a 2003 Indian Telugu-language romance film directed by E V V Satyanarayana, starring Sivaji, Aryan Rajesh and Anita Hassanandani. It is a remake of the 2002 Tamil film Mounam Pesiyadhe written and directed by Ameer Sultan, with Aryan Rajesh, Anita, Shivaji, and Sindhu replacing Suriya, Trisha, Nandha, and Maha, respectively, who originally played the roles. The film released on 30 August 2003. There is also a dubbed Telugu version of Mounam Pesiyadhe, titled as Kanchu, which released in 2006.

Plot
Surya (Aryan Rajesh) is a man who hates love. But somehow he is charmed by Brunda (Anita Hassanandani). Brunda likes his attitude and admires him as a friend. But her admiration coupled with a few coincidences makes Surya think that she is in love him. When he is expecting her to speak those magical words (I love you), she introduces Surya to her fiancé (Sai Kiran). After Brunda marries her beau, a damsel (Bhoomika Chawla) meets Surya and explains the flashback. That beautiful girl is a silent admirer of Surya and had been following him for years. She proposes to Surya when they were in college. Surya asks her to come back once he is financially settled, as love and life afterall need security. Finally Surya settles down with her and the movie ends on a happy note.

Cast

 Aryan Rajesh as Surya
 Sivaji as Krishna
 Anita Hassanandani as Brinda
 Sindhu Menon
 Sai Kiran as Brinda's fiancé
 Ambika Krishna
 Brahmanandam
 Ali
 Chandra Mohan as Krishna's father
 Chalapathi Rao as Brunda's father
 Krishna Bhagavan
 Mallikarjuna Rao
 Narra Venkateswara Rao
 MS Narayana
 Ahuti Prasad
 Giri Babu
 L.B. Sriram
 Benarjee
 Ganesh Sana
 Padma Jayanti
 Bhoomika Chawla in a cameo appearance

Soundtrack

The music, including film score, was composed by Ilaiyaraaja's youngest son, Yuvan Shankar Raja. The soundtrack comprises 7 tracks, composed by Yuvan Shankar Raja as well, out of which 5 songs were retained from the original film with minor modifications. The lyrics were written by Surendra Krishna. "Todakotti" is best song of this Album.The audio was launched live through Gemini TV, whereas viewers themselves could release one of the songs, by calling on a certain number. Out of 2.7 lakhs callers 7 people got the chance to release a song each.

References

External links
 Aadanthe Ado Type review at Idlebrain

Telugu remakes of Tamil films
2003 films
Films directed by E. V. V. Satyanarayana
Films scored by Yuvan Shankar Raja
2000s Telugu-language films